Antenor was an Athenian sculptor of the 6th century BC.

Antenor may also refer to:

People
Antenor (king), a king of the Cimmerian Bosporus
Antenor (mythology), a figure in Greek mythology
Antenor (writer), ancient Greek writer
Antenor of Provence (fl. c. 700), patrician of Provence
Anténor Firmin, (1850–1911), Haitian anthropologist, journalist, and politician
Antenor Nascentes, (1886–1972), Brazilian philologist, etymologist, and lexicographer
Antenor Orrego, (1892–1960), Peruvian writer and political philosopher
Antenor Patiño, (1896–1982), Bolivian tycoon

Other uses
Any one of five Alfred Holt and Company / Blue Funnel ships:

, steamship 1924–1953, serving as HMS Antenor during WW2

2207 Antenor, a Jovian (Jupiter) Trojan asteroid
Antenor Kore, a Late Archaic statue of a girl, attributed to the Athenian sculptor
Antenor Navarro Formation, an Early Cretaceous geologic formation in Brazil
Antenor Orrego Private University